Holbæk railway station ( or Holbæk Banegård) is the main railway station serving the town of Holbæk in northwestern Zealand, Denmark.

Holbæk station is located on the main line Northwest Line from Roskilde to Kalundborg and is the southern terminus of the Odsherredsbanen branch line from Holbæk to Nykøbing Sjælland. The station opened in 1874, and its second and current station building designed by the architect Ole Ejnar Bonding was inaugurated in 1972. It offers direct regional rail services to Copenhagen, Roskilde and Kalundborg operated by the national railway company DSB, as well as local train services to Nykøbing Sjælland, operated by the regional railway company Lokaltog.

See also
 List of railway stations in Denmark

References

Citations

Bibliography

External links

 Banedanmark – government agency responsible for maintenance and traffic control of most of the Danish railway network
 DSB – the Danish national train operating company
 Lokaltog – Danish regional railway company operating in the Capital Region and Region Zealand
 Danske Jernbaner – website with information on railway history in Denmark

Holbæk
Railway stations in Region Zealand
Buildings and structures in Holbæk Municipality
Railway stations opened in 1874
1874 establishments in Denmark
Adolf Ahrens railway stations
Ole Ejnar Bonding railway stations
Railway stations in Denmark opened in the 19th century